The 4th PGA Golden Laurel Awards, honoring the best film and television producers of 1992, were presented at the Beverly Wilshire Hotel in Los Angeles, California on March 3, 1993 after the winners were announced in February. The ceremony was hosted by James Earl Jones and the nominees were announced on February 3, 1993.

Winners and nominees

Film

Television

Special

References

 1992
1992 film awards
1992 television awards